Erchempert was a Benedictine monk of the Abbey of Monte Cassino in Italy in the final quarter of the ninth century. He chronicled a history of the Lombard Principality of Benevento, in the Langobardia Minor, giving an especially vivid account of the violence in southern Langobardia. Beginning with Duke Arechis II (758-787) and the Carolingian conquest of Benevento, his history, titled the Historia Langobardorum Beneventanorum degentium (The History of the Lombards living in Benevento), stops abruptly in the winter of 888-889. Just one medieval manuscript of this text survives, from the early fourteenth century.

Editions
Ystoriola Langobardorum Beneventi degentium - the Latin text, transcribed from the Monumenta Germaniae Historica
Erchempert's "History of the Lombards of Benevento": A translation and study of its place in the chronicle tradition - Joan Ferry's PhD thesis from Rice University, which includes an English translation of Erchempert's work
Erchemperto, Piccola Storia dei Longobardi di Benevento / Ystoriola Longobardorum Beneventum degentium, edition and translation into Italian by L. A. Berto (Naples: Liguori, 2013). 
Luigi Andrea Berto, ed. The Little History of the Lombards of Benevento by Erchempert: A Critical Edition and Translation of ‘Ystoriola Longobardorum Beneventum degentium’. Routledge, 2021.

Sources
L. A. Berto, “‘Copiare’ e ‘ricomporre’. Alcune ipotesi su come si scriveva nell’Italia meridionale altomedievale e sulla biblioteca di Montecassino nel nono secolo. Il caso della cronaca di Erchemperto” Medieval Sophia, 17, (2015), pp. 83-111. L. A. Berto, “Erchempert, a Reluctant Fustigator of His People: History and Ethnic Pride in Southern Italy at the End of the Ninth Century”, Mediterranean Studies, 20, 2 (2012), pp. 147-175.
L. A. Berto, “Linguaggio, contenuto, autori e destinatari nella Langobardia meridionale. Il caso della cosiddetta dedica della “Historia Langobardorum Beneventanorum” di Erchemperto“, Viator. Medieval and Renaissance Studies, Multilingual, 43 (2012), pp. 1-14.
L. A. Berto, “L’immagine delle élites longobarde nella “Historia Langobardorum Beneventanorum” di Erchemperto”, Archivio Storico Italiano, CLXX, 2 (2012), pp. 195-233.
L. A. Berto, Making History in Ninth-Century Northern and Southern Italy (Pisa: Pisa University Press, 2018), pp. 69-111. 

Italian chroniclers
9th-century Lombard people
Italian Benedictines
9th-century Italian historians
9th-century Latin writers